Joshua Wolfe Hohneck (born 6 January 1986) is a New Zealand rugby union footballer. His regular playing position is as a prop. He has played for the Championship winning Highlanders in Super Rugby and Waikato in the Mitre 10 Cup.

On 31 March 2016, Hohneck traveled to England to join Gloucester in the Premiership Rugby from the 2016–17 season.

On 23 July 2020, Hohneck announced he left Gloucester to return to New Zealand due to personal reasons.

Career honours

Chiefs

Super Rugby – 2012, 2013

Highlanders

Super Rugby – 2015

References

External links 
Chiefs profile
Bay of Plenty profile
Yahoo NZ profile
itsrugby.co.uk profile

Living people
1986 births
New Zealand rugby union players
Chiefs (rugby union) players
Bay of Plenty rugby union players
Waikato rugby union players
Otago rugby union players
Highlanders (rugby union) players
Rugby union players from Auckland
Rugby union props
Māori All Blacks players
Gloucester Rugby players
New Zealand expatriate rugby union players
Expatriate rugby union players in England
New Zealand expatriate sportspeople in England
Ngāti Whātua people
Ngāti Manuhiri people